10th Class Diaries is a 2022 Indian Telugu-language coming-of-age romantic comedy film directed and filmed by Garudavega Anji (in his directorial debut) from a story written by Vennela Ramarao. The film stars Sriram, Avika Gor, Srinivasa Reddy, Ramarao, Himaja and Archana.

The plot follows Somu (Sriram), an affluent NRI who returns from the US for a reunion with his schoolmates in India. When his childhood sweetheart Chandini (Gor) doesn't turn up, Somu continues his search for her.

10th Class Diaries was theatrically released on 1 July 2022.

Plot 
Somu an affluent NRI who returns from the US for a reunion with his schoolmates in India. When his childhood sweetheart Chandini doesn't turn up, Somu continues his search for her.

Cast 

Sriram as Somayaji a.k.a. Somu
Avika Gor as Chandini
TikTok Nithyasree as young Chandini
Srinivasa Reddy as Half Boil
Himaja as Nagalakshmi   
Vennela Ramarao as Gourav 
Archana as Soumya
Nassar as Chandini's father
Rajeswari Nair
Siva Balaji
Madhumitha
Sanjay Swaroop as Psychiatrist 
Bhanu
Rohini
Satya Krishnan as Gourav's wife
Thagubothu Ramesh
 Gemini Suresh
Ambati Srinu
Jabardast Ramu
 Chitram Seenu 
Jabardast Borababu
Ganapati
Shivaji Raja 
Rupa Lakshmi

Production and release
The film began production in early 2021. Anji and Sriram were to work together on a Tamil film and came together instead for this film, which is based on an event in producer Achut Ramarao's life. This film marks the directorial debut of cinematographer Anji and is his 50th film as a cinematographer. The film is about the reunion of 10th standard classmates. Avika Gor plays a character older than herself. The film was shot in Chikmagalur, Hyderabad, Rajahmundry, Sri Lanka and the United States.

10th Class Diaries was theatrically released on 1 July 2022. Initially, the film was scheduled to be released on 4 March 2022. It was later pushed back to 24 June 2022, before postponing to the current date.

Reception 
A critic from The Times of India opined that "What works in favour of the film is its light-hearted humour, the effervescent feeling of love, cinematic and peppy vibe after the interval and impressive performances by the lead and supporting actors". A critic from 123Telugu wrote that "On the whole, 10th Class Diaries is an okayish movie that works only in parts. Comedy by Vennela Ramarao and a few emotional scenes are fine to watch".

Calling it "mixed memories," a reviewer from NTV appreciated the storyline and cinematography but pointed out uninspiring screenplay and music as its minus points. Sanju of Sakshi felt that despite faltering at times, Anji has succeeded in delivering a good film in his directorial debut. Aithagoni Raju of Asianet News Telugu opined that 10th Class Diaries takes the viewers down their memory lanes. In a more critical review, ABP Desam rated 1/5, writing that the screenplay tests the patience of audience.

References

External links

2022 films
2020s Telugu-language films
Indian coming-of-age comedy-drama films
Indian romantic comedy films
2022 romantic comedy films
2020s coming-of-age comedy-drama films
Films set in the United States
Films set in Miami
Films set in Andhra Pradesh
Films set in Rajahmundry
Films shot in Rajahmundry
Films shot in Hyderabad, India
Films shot in Karnataka
Films shot in Sri Lanka
Films shot in the United States